Saravanan is an Indian actor who has appeared in Tamil-language films. He made his acting debut through Vaidhehi Vanthachu (1991), where he portrayed the lead role. He continued to play the lead roles in films throughout the 1990s, later turning into a producer and director for his films. After a sabbatical, Saravanan made a comeback through Paruthiveeran (2007) in a supporting role, and has since continued to play character roles in Tamil films. Ilaya Thalapathy title was first used for Saravanan In the year of  1993 || Nallathe Nadakkum movie

Early life and family
Saravanan was born into a Tamil family in Salem and was the second of five children. His father was a police inspector and his mother was a staff nurse. Saravanan obtained a Bachelor of Arts degree in Tamil Literature from the Government Arts College, Salem.

Saravanan has been married twice. His first marriage was to Suryashree, a Telugu woman with whom he studied in Adyar Film Institute. In an episode of Bigg Boss Tamil 3, he opened up on his second marriage and that it was his first wife who accepted the second marriage as they wanted a child.

Career
Saravanan had an interest in Tamil films as a child and regularly took part in performance arts during school. He visited the sets of a film being shot in Salem by director M. Sivachandran and requested him for an opportunity to act in his films. He consequently became acquainted with Sivachandran and his then-wife, Lakshmi, and the pair were keen to launch him as an actor opposite Lakshmi's daughter Aishwarya, but the plans did not materialise. Saravanan then moved to Chennai and completed a course in acting at the Adyar Film Institute. While on campus, he was spotted by director Radha Bharathi, who offered him the chance to be a part of the film Vaidehi Vandhachu (1991). Saravanan subsequently played a series of the lead role in films in the 1990s, but his career came to a halt in the latter end of the decade. Towards the end of the first phase of his career, he produced two of his films Vishwanath (1996) and Santosham (1998). Though Santhosam did well at the box office, still, he incurred losses as a producer which led him to take a long break from acting. He organised concerts abroad to clear the losses. In 2001, Saravanan appeared in a negative role in Bala's Nandha, winning critical acclaim, but did not appear in any other roles at the time. He also directed, Thayumanavan (2003) in an attempt to get his career back on track however the film went unnoticed.

He went on to make a comeback in Ameer Sultan's Paruthiveeran (2007) playing the paternal uncle of the character portrayed by Karthi, and won critical acclaim for his performance. A critic from Rediff.com noted "Saravanan excels and doesn't look like someone back from a long break", while Sify.com's reviewer stated his performance as the "wayward uncle with a heart of gold is terrific". Saravanan was awarded the Filmfare Award for Best Tamil Actor and also received a nomination in the same category for the Vijay Awards. The success of Paruthiveeran subsequently triggered more offers for the actor including the opportunity to be a part of Sanjay Ram's biopic, Veeramum Eeramum (2007), based on the real life of Venkatesa Pannaiyar. In the late 2000s and early 2010s, Saravanan continued to play supporting roles in Tamil films, sometimes appearing in negative roles.

On 23 June 2019, he entered the reality television show Bigg Boss Tamil 3 hosted by Kamal Haasan on Star Vijay. He was ejected from the show after making controversial remarks on a televised show, where he admitted to harassing women on public transport during his youth.

Filmography

Television

References

External links

Living people
Male actors from Chennai
Male actors in Tamil cinema
Indian male film actors
20th-century Indian male actors
21st-century Indian male actors
People from Salem, Tamil Nadu
1966 births
Male actors in Malayalam cinema
Bigg Boss (Tamil TV series) contestants